Antoine Viterale (born 1 July 1996; in Hong Kong) is a Hong Kong footballer currently playing in Switzerland for 2. Liga Interregional club Lugano U21. He describes himself as a left-winger rather than a centre-forward.

Youth career
Antoine Viterale was born to an Italian father and a French mother. His father, Giovanni Viterale, worked for Conrad Hotel, while in Hong Kong. Antoine lived in Hong Kong for 14 years since birth and was an academy player for Kitchee. He signed for Swiss side FC Lugano's U-18 squad, before breaking into RCD Espanyol's youth ranks. He would later move to Italian club Chievo Verona., before switching to Hellas Verona. Viterale trialed with Inter Milan in 2010 but was not offered a contract.

In December 2015,  Viterale moved with his family into a condominium in Singapore. Originally, he was set to play for Tampines Rovers' Prime League team but the striker tore his ankle ligaments during a training session. Around May 2016 he got a call from an agent who explained that Garena Young Lions were seeking a striker so Antoine trained there for a few months; however, the forward never got a contract there  despite having forged a good relationship with then coach Patrick Hesse.

Club career

Hougang United
Antoine Viterale signed with Hougang United in December 2016 after scoring in two friendlies against MISC-MIFA and DRB-Hicom. Making his debut in a 2-0 triumph over Garena Young Lions, Viterale scored his first goal for Hougang United against Ceres–Negros in the 2017 Singapore Cup on 20 June 2017.

Lugano
On 3 March 2019, Viterale returned to Europe, signing with Swiss Super League club Lugano.

Career statistics

Club

Personal life

His family currently resides in Singapore.

References

External links

1996 births
Living people
Hong Kong footballers
Italian footballers
Hong Kong people of Italian descent
Hong Kong people of French descent
Hougang United FC players
FC Lugano players
Singapore Premier League players
Association football forwards
Italian expatriate footballers
Expatriate footballers in Switzerland
2. Liga Interregional players